Howard is a borough in Centre County, Pennsylvania, United States. It is part of the State College, Pennsylvania Metropolitan Statistical Area. The population was 720 at the 2010 census.

Geography
Howard is located at  (41.013857, -77.654809).

Demographics

At the 2010 census there were 720 people, 290 households, and 204 families in the borough. The population density was 2,083.1 people per square mile (804.5/km²). There were 311 housing units at an average density of 899.8 per square mile (347.5/km²). The racial makeup of the borough was 97.5% White, 0.4% Black or African American, 0.3% Asian, 0.7% other, and 1.1% of two or more races. Hispanic or Latino of any race were 1.4%.

There were 290 households, 33.1% had children under the age of 18 living with them, 56.2% were married couples living together, 3.4% had a male householder with no wife present, 10.7% had a female householder with no husband present, and 29.7% were non-families. 22.4% of households were made up of individuals, and 11.0% were one person aged 65 or older. The average household size was 2.48 and the average family size was 2.89.

The age distribution was 23.2% under the age of 18, 6.9% from 18 to 24, 28.4% from 25 to 44, 27.5% from 45 to 64, and 14.0% 65 or older. The median age was 40 years. For every 100 females there were 105.1 males. For every 100 females age 18 and over, there were 99.6 males.

The median household income was $51,548 and the median family income  was $54,107.  The per capita income for the borough was $25,304. About 5.9% of families and 8.0% of the population were below the poverty line, including 7.4% of those under age 18 and 13.6% of those age 65 or over.

References

Populated places established in 1770
Boroughs in Centre County, Pennsylvania
1864 establishments in Pennsylvania